Kevin Rozo Garcia (born 1 November 1994 in Miami, Florida, United States) is an American soccer player who plays for Patriotas Boyacá of the Colombian Categoría Primera A.

Early life

Relocating with his family to Colombia at the age of 3, Rozo moved back to the US from 2001 to 2004.

Career

Youth

Joining the  Millonarios F.C. youth system in 2006, Rozo went to Argentina for a three-month spell with the River Plate academy in 2011 before returning to Colombia to concentrate on his studying. He is still thinking about going back to Argentina since he described his time there as unambiguously one of the best soccer experiences he had.

Senior

Added to American NASL club Indy Eleven's squad in 2014, the American made zero outings for the team, penning a deal with Llaneros F.C. some months later. Next, the attacker transferred to Patriotas Boyacá where he plies his trade for as of 2016.

Trialed with some innominate Portuguese clubs in 2013.

International

Called up to the United States Under-17 in 2010, he played in a 3-2 defeat to the Colombia U17.

Personal life

Radamel Falcao, a family friend, gave Rozo the cleats he wore at the 2012 UEFA Super Cup.

References

American sportspeople of Colombian descent
American soccer players
Association football wingers
Association football midfielders
Living people
1994 births
American expatriate soccer players
Expatriate footballers in Colombia
Millonarios F.C. players
Indy Eleven players
Llaneros F.C. players
Patriotas Boyacá footballers